Kwantlen may refer to one of the following:

Kwantlen people, an indigenous Coast Salish people in British Columbia
Kwantlen First Nation, the band government of the Kwantlen people
Kwantlen Polytechnic University, formerly Kwantlen College, a public university located in the South Fraser region of British Columbia, Canada
Kwantlen Student Association, the organization representing students at Kwantlen Polytechnic University